Mycalesis oculus, the red-disc bushbrown, is a satyrine butterfly found in southern India. It is similar in markings to Mycalesis adolphei but distinguished by the reddish band around the large apical spots on the upper forewings.

Description
Somewhat similar to Mycalesis adolphei but the eyespots on the median vein of the upper forewing much larger and encircled by a broad ring of orange red and extending towards the costal margin (leading edge). The underside is dark reddish brown. The eyespot on the hindwing is larger than in M. adolphei. The wingspan is about 5 to 6 cm. The species is found mainly in the hill forests of the southern Western Ghats.

References

Mycalesis
Butterflies of Asia